The Donna Jean Godchaux Band (sometimes known as the Donna Jean Godchaux Band with Jeff Mattson) is an American rock music group. Originally named Kettle Joe's Psychedelic Swamp Revue, and later Donna Jean and the Tricksters, the band was originally formed in 2007 and made up of Donna Jean Godchaux-MacKay (formerly of the Grateful Dead) and members of the Zen Tricksters.  The group released their first album in 2008 - a self-titled under their previous name Donna Jean and the Tricksters.

In March 2009, the band changed their name and membership from Donna Jean and the Tricksters to their current name and line-up.

Discography
For Rex: The Black Tie Dye Ball - The Zen Tricksters w/ Donna Godchaux, Mickey Hart, Tom Constanten, David Nelson, Michael Falzarano, Rob Barraco (2006)
Donna Jean and the Tricksters (2008)
Back Around  – Donna Jean Godchaux Band with Jeff Mattson (2014)

Notes

External links

 

American rock music groups
Grateful Dead
Jam bands